The 2010 Euroleague Final Four was the concluding EuroLeague Final Four tournament that determined the winner of the 2009–10 Euroleague season. It was held at the Palais Omnisports de Paris-Bercy, Paris, France on May 7 and 9, 2010. The contestants were four former EuroLeague champions, and three of the previous year's EuroLeague Final Four teams CSKA Moscow, Olympiacos, Regal FC Barcelona, plus new entry Partizan Belgrade. Barcelona won their second EuroLeague crown, beating Olympiacos 86–68, in the final.

Venue 
The Palais Omnisports de Paris-Bercy, often abbreviated as POPB or Bercy, is an indoor sports arena in the 12th arrondissement of Paris, France. Opened in 1984, and with a seating capacity of 15,603, it had hosted three EuroLeague Final Fours before 2010, in 1991, 1996, and 2000.

Bracket

Semifinals 
All times are in Central European Summer Time.

Semifinal 1

Semifinal 2

Third place game

Final

External links 
 Official Site

Final Four
2009–10
2009–10 in Greek basketball
2009–10 in Russian basketball
2009–10 in Spanish basketball
2009–10 in Serbian basketball
2009–10 in French basketball
International basketball competitions hosted by France
Basketball in Paris